Flabob Airport  is a small public-use airport located in Jurupa Valley, California, United States, in Riverside County, seven nautical miles (11 km) northwest of the central business district of Jurupa Valley, California.

Location and history
The airport is located in the city of Jurupa Valley beside the Santa Ana River. Established in 1925 by Flavio Madariaga and Bob Bogan, the name of the airport was derived by combining the first three letters of their names.

Facilities
Flabob Airport has a "control tower" (the airport is a non-towered airport and exists in Class G airspace) and several permanent aircraft hangars. It has one runway designated 6/24 with an asphalt surface measuring 3,200 by 50 feet (975 x 15 m).

Operations and based aircraft

For the 12-month period ending 31 December 2004, the airport had 40,000 general aviation aircraft operations, an average of 109 per day. At that time there were 202 aircraft based at this airport, 94% single-engine and 6% multi-engine.

Flabob airport is home to Experimental Aircraft Association Chapter #1, launched by Ray Stits and since joined by over 1,000 more EAA chapters worldwide. The airport is also birthplace of the Marquart MA-5 Charger airplane, and of the Polyfiber aircraft fabric company founded by Ray Stits, who also created the popular Stits Playboy homebuilt aircraft at Flabob.

References

External links 
 Flabob.org — Flabob Airport
 eaach1.org — EAA Chapter 1
 Aerial photo as of 2 June 2002 from USGS The National Map

Airports in Riverside County, California
Jurupa Valley, California
Airports established in 1925
1925 establishments in California